Kathryn Leigh Scott (born Marlene Kringstad; January 26, 1943) is an American television and film actress and writer who is best remembered for playing several roles on Dark Shadows.

Early life
Scott was born in Robbinsdale, Minnesota, of Norwegian descent.

Career

Scott grew up on a farm in Robbinsdale, Minnesota, the daughter of Ole Kringstad, a Norwegian immigrant, and Hilda Karlsgodt Kringstad, of Norwegian descent. She attended Northwestern University in their summer "cherub" program while in high school. In 1962 she moved to New York to study at the American Academy of Dramatic Arts on a scholarship while working as a Playboy Bunny in the original New York Playboy Club at 59th and Fifth Avenue. Upon graduation from the American Academy of Dramatic Arts, Kathryn landed the ingénue lead in the classic Gothic daytime drama Dark Shadows (ABC, 1966-1971), and starred in the 1970 MGM feature House of Dark Shadows in 1970. Kathryn played four roles in the series: Maggie Evans, Josette du Pres, Lady Kitty Hampshire and Rachel Drummond.

In 1971, she moved to Paris, France, with her fiance, Time/Life photojournalist Ben Martin. In Paris, Kathryn played twins in the French language film L'alfomega. After marrying later that year in Vikebukt, Norway, she and her husband moved to London, England, where she continued working as an actress. She appeared in several television films including Crime of Passion, Harriet's Back In Town, The Turn of the Screw, Marked Personal, Come Die With Me, Dial M For Murder, Space: 1999, and the miniseries Late Call, Edward The King, and The Exiles. Scott also appeared in the 1980 British television series Hammer House of Horror episode, "Visitor From The Grave."  She also appeared in the feature films Brannigan with John Wayne; Providence with Dirk Bogarde, directed by Alain Resnais; The Great Gatsby, with Robert Redford and Mia Farrow, directed by Jack Clayton; and The Greek Tycoon with Anthony Quinn and Jacqueline Bisset. In 1974, she played Nurse Kelly in a six-month run of Harvey with James Stewart, directed by Sir Anthony Quayle, at the Prince of Wales Theatre, London. The following year she was in a new play, Le Weekend, at the Bristol Old Vic, Bristol, England.

In 1978 Scott moved to Los Angeles to star in the CBS series Big Shamus, Little Shamus with Brian Dennehy. She guest-starred in a succession of television series, and then returned to England to film The Last Days of Patton with George C. Scott; Murrow with Daniel J. Travanti; Voice of the Heart with James Brolin; and Chandlertown with Powers Boothe.

In 1985, Scott launched Pomegranate Press, Ltd. to publish books about the entertainment industry, including guide books, biographies, textbooks and coffee table art books. She wrote The Bunny Years (the 25-year history of Playboy Clubs told through the women who worked as Bunnies), which was sold to Imagine Entertainment's Brian Grazer. She also co-produced a two-hour special for the A&E Network, and a one-hour documentary for BBC-1 and Canadian TV, based on the book. Pomegranate has published over 50 nonfiction titles, including Scott's books Lobby Cards: The Classic Films (Benjamin Franklin Award for Best Coffee TableBook) and Lobby Cards: The Classic Comedies, both of which were published in the U.K. by Bloomsbury. She published a trade paperback edition of the hardcover biography Coya Come Home, with a foreword by Walter Mondale (2012).

Scott wrote Dark Shadows Memories, to coincide with the series' 20th anniversary, and Dark Shadows Companion as a 25th anniversary tribute. She has written three novels -- Dark Passages (2012), Down and Out in Beverly Heels (2013), and Jinxed (2015); a memoir, Last Dance at the Savoy (Cumberland Press, 2016); and a trilogy of books on care-giving: Now With You, Now Without, The Happy Hours, and A Welcome Respite (Grand Harbor, 2017).

Scott plays Mamie Eisenhower in the feature film The Eleventh Green (2019) with Campbell Scott. She has also recently appeared in Three Christs (2018) with Richard Gere and Juliana Margulies, and Woody Allen's A Rainy Day in New York (2018). She appeared in Hallmark Channel's Broadcasting Christmas (2016) and Lifetime's A Wedding to Die For (2017), and has a recurring role as George Segal's girlfriend Miriam in The Goldbergs. She wrote Dark Shadows: Return to Collinwood (2012), and appeared in a cameo role in the Johnny Depp/Tim Burton film Dark Shadows (2012).

After Scott's divorce from Ben Martin in 1990, they continued as partners in Pomegranate Press and remained close until his death in 2017. Scott married Geoff Miller, founding editor and publisher of Los Angeles Magazine in 1991. He died from progressive supra-nuclear palsy in 2011. Kathryn is a national volunteer spokesperson for CurePSP.

She has served on the Boards of the Beverly Hills Women's Club and the Women's Club of Hollywood.

Pomegranate Press
In 1986, Scott founded Pomegranate Press, which published her books about Dark Shadows, as well as other books authored by her, including The Bunny Years, about the 25-year history of Playboy Bunnies, and coffee table books on film art. Pomegranate Press has also published books by other authors, mainly nonfiction entertainment titles. Today, she continues to work as an actress (Three Christs with Richard Gere, 2017) and writer (Last Dance At the Savoy, Now With You, Now Without). She reprised a number of her Dark Shadows roles in a series of audio dramas. Scott co-wrote (with Jim Pierson) Dark Shadows: Return to Collinwood, an updated retrospective on the original series, including the Tim Burton remake with Johnny Depp, in which Scott has a cameo role. The book was released on April 3, 2012 via Pomegranate Press.

Personal life
Scott married her first husband, photographer Ben Martin, in 1971. They divorced in 1990, although the two remained business partners in Pomegranate Press. Martin died in February 2017.

In 1991, she married Los Angeles magazine founder Geoff Miller. She and Miller remained together until his death from progressive supranuclear palsy in 2011.

Filmography

Television

Notes

References

External links 
 
 
 Interview with Kathryn Leigh Scott
 Pomegranate Press
 Original Dark Shadows Audio Dramas starring Kathryn Leigh Scott
   Audio interview with Kathryn Leigh Scott on Deep Dish Radio re: Acting career and publishing
 Kathryn Leigh Scott interview at Classic Film & TV Cafe
If not now, when?

1943 births
Actresses from Minnesota
American film actresses
American people of Norwegian descent
American television actresses
American women writers
Living people
People from Robbinsdale, Minnesota
21st-century American women